André Cognard 8th dan, shihan, is the current head of Kobayashi aikido since the death of its founder Hirokazu Kobayashi (aikidoka). He has published several books on martial arts in French language.

Published works
Andre Cognard: Le corps conscient  Dervy, 1999, 
Andre Cognard: Civilisation et arts martiaux, ou, Le noeud de la ceinture  Albin Michel Publications, France, 2000, 
Andre Cognard: Le disciple, Dervy, 2002  
Andre Cognard: Le corps philosophe, Centon, 2003 
Andre Cognard: L'esprit des arts martiaux  Albin Michel Publications, France, 2003, 
Andre Cognard: Le maître, Dervy, 2004 
Andre Cognard: Vivre sans ennemi, Le Relié, 2004 
Andre Cognard: Petit manuel d'aikido, Centon, 2005 
Andre Cognard: Mémoires d'outre-moi, Centon, 2006 
Nadja Maria Acioly-Régnier, Clémentine Amouroux, Jean Jacques Boutaud, Paul Castella, Patrick Chignol, André Cognard, Andrea Debiasi, Marco Favretti, Victor Gouttebroze, Sergio Morra, Giangiorgio Pasqualotto, Jean Claude Régnier, Shingai Tanaka: Pour qu'éduquer ne soit pas un monologue, 2008 
Andre Cognard: Lhassa, Osaka, Essendilène, Centon, 2010 
Andre Cognard: La disciple et les sabres invincibles, Centon, 2012 
Andre Cognard: Père, Fils, Centon, 2012

External links
  Livres écrits par André Cognard
  Thèse de Patrick Chignol en Sciences de l'éducation sur l'influence de la pratique de l’Aikido sur le développement du sujet
  Interview avec André Cognard
  Les points de vue d'André Cognard

References

Living people
French aikidoka
French male writers
Year of birth missing (living people)